Blue Moon is the eighth in the Anita Blake: Vampire Hunter series of horror/mystery/erotica novels by Laurell K. Hamilton.

Plot introduction

Blue Moon continues the adventures of Anita Blake.  In this novel, Anita travels to Myerton, Tennessee to help clear her ex-boyfriend Richard of rape allegations.  In the process, Anita and her various allies are drawn into a supernatural conflict with the Master Vampire of that city, as well as the criminal scheme that Richard's frame-up was meant to conceal.  As with the other later novels in the series, Blue Moon blends elements of supernatural, hardboiled detective, and erotic fiction.

Explanation of the novel's title
As with previous novels, "Blue Moon" refers to a location within the novel itself. In this case, the "Blue Moon cabins" are a set of rental cabins owned by Verne, the local Ulfric.  Within the novel, the term "blue moon" is also used to refer to an upcoming full moon, the second in that calendar month, which is a rare occurrence.

Plot summary

Blue Moon takes place in the apparently fictional town of Myerton, Tennessee. Richard, still recovering from Anita's rejection in The Killing Dance, has been in Myerton for some time, studying a local group of trolls as part of the requirements for his master's degree, and auditioning the women of the local werewolf tribe as possible lupas.

The plot begins when Anita receives a call from Richard's brother Daniel.  Daniel explains that Richard has been arrested for an alleged rape, and is refusing to hire a lawyer.  Anita leaves for Myerton, over the objection of the local Master of the City, with Asher, Damian, and most of the wereleopards as backup.

Once there, Anita must simultaneously attempt to uncover why local police have framed Richard and deal with Colin, the local Master of the City, who views her arrival as an act of war.

Ultimately, Anita destroys most of Colin's vampires by activating the lupanar of the local werewolf clan, rendering it holy ground, and kills Colin herself by shooting Colin's human servant, Nikki.  In the course of her various rituals, Anita ends up having sex with Richard, and they agree that Anita will begin dating both Richard and Jean-Claude.  Anita also learns that Richard had discussed her with Jean-Claude and had obliquely asked Jean-Claude whether he would accept Anita taking Richard as a lover.

Anita meets Marianne, a Wiccan practitioner who works with Verne's pack.  Marianne advises Anita on building the wereleopards into a coherent group.  Anita also has a long talk with Damien, and discovers that Jean-Claude gains power from lust and sex. Not only can he feed on the patrons of his strip club Guilty Pleasures, but on sex with Anita, or Anita having sex with Richard.

She and Richard discover that the rape charges were an effort by art collector Frank Niley to drive Richard's study project from the area, allowing them to acquire some contested land and complete Niley's search for the Spear of Destiny.  In desperation, Niley kidnaps and brutalizes Richard's mother and brother, causing Anita to cross another moral line, torturing Niley's messenger and killing everyone responsible.

Characters in Blue Moon

Major characters
Blue Moon features the following major characters:
 Anita Blake:
 Jean-Claude: Jean-Claude only appears near the start of the book, but is still mentioned or talked about throughout.
 Richard:
 Asher:
 Damian:

Other characters

Recurring characters in Blue Moon include: 
 Jason:
 Zane:
 Cherry:
 Nathaniel:
 Jamil:
 Dolph:
 
Non-recurring characters include:
 Colin: the Master of the City, died when Anita killed his human servant Nikki.
 Barnaby:
 Nikki:  Colin's human servant, was killed by Anita after she lured and tried to kill Asher.

Major themes

Allusions/references to other works
 Frank Niley and his entourage appear to be inspired by The Maltese Falcon.  Niley's appearance and demeanor closely resemble Sydney Greenstreet's portrayal of "Kaspar Gutman" from the 1941 film adaptation of that novel, while Howard's physical description closely resembles that of Peter Lorre, who played Gutman's associate, "Joel Cairo" in the film. Similarly, Niley's futile quest for the Spear of Destiny resembles Gutman's chase after the eponymous falcon.

Release details

1998 American novels
American erotic novels
Anita Blake: Vampire Hunter novels
Low fantasy novels
Novels set in Memphis, Tennessee
Werewolf novels
Ace Books books